Hiru FM is a Sinhala radio station in Sri Lanka owned by ABC Radio Networks. It covers the whole island.

Controversy
In August 2020, the hosts of Hiru FM made xenophobic remarks and derogatory comments about popular South Korean boy band BTS during a live talk show which eventually triggered backlash on social media. bru bn

Awards
Most Popular Radio Channel - International MACO Awards 2012

References

Sinhala-language radio stations in Sri Lanka
Asia Broadcasting Corporation